The All is the sixth studio album by American hip hop duo Smif-N-Wessun. It was released on February 22, 2019 through Duck Down Music. Production was handled by 9th Wonder and members of his production team The Soul Council, including Khrysis, Eric G., E. Jones and Nottz. It features guest appearances from Heather Victoria, GQ, Musiq Soulchild, Raekwon, Rapsody, Rick Ross and SmittytheCAINSMITH.

Track listing

Personnel 
 Darrell "Steele" Yates Jr. – main artist, executive producer
 Tekomin "Tek" Williams – main artist, executive producer
 Heather Victoria – featured artist (tracks: 3, 9)
 Corey "Raekwon" Woods – featured artist (track 3)
 Talib "Musiq Soulchild" Johnson – featured artist (track 4)
 Marlanna "Rapsody" Evans – featured artist (track 4)
 SmittytheCAINSMITH – featured artist (track 6)
 William "Rick Ross" Roberts II – featured artist (track 7)
 Quentin "GQ" Thomas – featured artist (track 9)
 Eric Jones – producer (track 1), executive producer
 Christopher "Khrysis" Tyson – producer (tracks: 2, 4, 6, 9-11), executive producer
 Patrick "9th Wonder" Douthit – producer (tracks: 3, 5, 8), executive producer
 Dominick "Nottz" Lamb – producer (track 7), executive producer
 Eric Gabouer – producer (track 12), executive producer
 Kenyatta "Buckshot" Blake – associate executive producer
 Drew "Dru-Ha" Friedman – associate executive producer
 Tanda Francis – design
 Akintola Hanif – photography
 Robert Adam Mayer – photography

References

External links 

2019 albums
Smif-n-Wessun albums
Duck Down Music albums
Albums produced by Nottz
Albums produced by Khrysis
Albums produced by 9th Wonder